The broad-billed warbler (Tickellia hodgsoni) is a species of bush warbler (family Cettiidae). It was formerly included in the "Old World warbler" assemblage, and belongs to the monotypic genus Tickellia.

It is found in Bhutan, China, India, Laos, Myanmar, Nepal, and Vietnam. Its natural habitats are subtropical or tropical moist lowland forest and subtropical or tropical moist montane forest.

References

broad-billed warbler
Birds of Bhutan
Birds of Nepal
Birds of Northeast India
Birds of Myanmar
Birds of Laos
Birds of Vietnam
broad-billed warbler
Taxonomy articles created by Polbot